Shattered Dreams is a 1922 American silent drama film directed by Paul Scardon and starring Miss DuPont, Bertram Grassby and Herbert Heyes.

Cast
 Miss DuPont as Marie Moselle
 Bertram Grassby as Théophine Grusant
 Herbert Heyes as Louis du Bois
 Eric Mayne as The Police Commissioner

References

Bibliography
 Munden, Kenneth White. The American Film Institute Catalog of Motion Pictures Produced in the United States, Part 1. University of California Press, 1997.

External links

1922 films
1922 drama films
American black-and-white films
Silent American drama films
American silent feature films
1920s English-language films
Films directed by Paul Scardon
Universal Pictures films
Films set in Paris
1920s American films